This is a list of Law Enforcement Agencies in the state of Florida.

According to the US Bureau of Justice Statistics' 2018 Census of State and Local Law Enforcement Agencies, the state had 373 law enforcement agencies employing 47,177 sworn police officers, about 222 for each 100,000 residents.

Federal Agencies 

These are federal agencies that have common operations within the state.

Administrative Office of the United States Courts, Office of Probation and Pretrial Services
Amtrak Police Department
Bureau of Alcohol, Tobacco, Firearms and Explosives
Bureau of Industry and Security, Office of Export Enforcement
Department of the Air Force Police
Department of the Navy Police
Drug Enforcement Administration
Federal Air Marshal Service
Federal Bureau of Investigation
Federal Bureau of Prisons
Federal Protective Service
Internal Revenue Service, Criminal Investigations Division
National Aeronautics and Space Administration, Protective Services
National Oceanic and Atmospheric Administration Office of Law Enforcement
National Park Service
National Nuclear and Security Administration, Office of Secure Transport
United States Air Force Office of Special Investigations
United States Air Force Security Forces
United States Army Military Police

United States Coast Guard
United States Customs and Border Protection
United States Department of Veterans Affairs Police
United States Diplomatic Security Service
United States Environmental Protection Agency Criminal Investigation Division
United States Fish and Wildlife Service Office of Law Enforcement
United States Fish and Wildlife Service Refuge Law Enforcement
United States Food and Drug Administration Office of Criminal Investigations
United States Forest Service Law Enforcement and Investigations
United States Immigration and Customs Enforcement
United States Marine Corps Criminal Investigation Division
United States Marine Corps Military Police
United States Marine Corps Police
United States Marshal Service
United States Naval Criminal Investigative Service
United States Navy Security Forces
United States Postal Inspection Service
United States Secret Service

State Agencies 

 Florida Department of Agriculture and Consumer Services
 Office of Agricultural Law Enforcement
 Florida Department of Business and Professional Regulation
 Division of Alcoholic Beverages and Tobacco
 Bureau of Law Enforcement
Florida Department of Corrections
 Office of Inspector General
 Bureau of State Investigations/Law Enforcement
 Florida Department of Environmental Protection
 Division of Law Enforcement
 Environmental Crimes Unit
 Florida Department of Financial Services
 Division of Investigative and Forensic Services
 Florida Department of Highway Safety and Motor Vehicles
  Division of Florida Highway Patrol
   Florida Department of Law Enforcement
 Division of Investigations and Forensic Science
  Division of Florida Capitol Police
 Florida Fish and Wildlife Conservation Commission
 Division of Law Enforcement
 Florida Lottery
 Division of Security
 Florida Office of the Attorney General
 Medicaid Fraud Control Unit
 Florida Supreme Court
 Office of the Marshal
Florida First District Court of Appeal
Office of the Marshal
Florida Second District Court of Appeal
Office of the Marshal
Florida Third District Court of Appeal
Office of the Marshal
Florida Fourth District Court of Appeal
Office of the Marshal
Florida Fifth District Court of Appeal
Office of the Marshal
 Offices of State Attorney 
1st Judicial Circuit of Florida - Pensacola
2nd Judicial Circuit of Florida - Tallahassee
3rd Judicial Circuit of Florida - Live Oak
4th Judicial Circuit of Florida - Jacksonville
5th Judicial Circuit of Florida - Ocala
6th Judicial Circuit of Florida - Clearwater
7th Judicial Circuit of Florida - Daytona Beach
8th Judicial Circuit of Florida - Gainesville
9th Judicial Circuit of Florida - Orlando
10th Judicial Circuit of Florida - Bartow
11th Judicial Circuit of Florida - Miami
12th Judicial Circuit of Florida - Sarasota
13th Judicial Circuit of Florida - Tampa
14th Judicial Circuit of Florida - Panama City
15th Judicial Circuit of Florida - West Palm Beach
16th Judicial Circuit of Florida - Key West
17th Judicial Circuit of Florida - Fort Lauderdale
18th Judicial Circuit of Florida - Viera
19th Judicial Circuit of Florida - Fort Pierce
20th Judicial Circuit of Florida - Fort Myers

County Agencies 

Alachua County Sheriff's Office
Baker County Sheriff's Office
Bay County Sheriff's Office
Bradford County Sheriff's Office
Brevard County Sheriff's Office
Broward County Sheriff's Office
Calhoun County Sheriff's Office
Charlotte County Sheriff's Office
Citrus County Sheriff's Office
Clay County Sheriff's Office
Collier County Sheriff's Office
Columbia County Sheriff's Office
DeSoto County Sheriff's Office
Dixie County Sheriff's Office
Escambia County Sheriff's Office
Flagler County Sheriff's Office
Franklin County Sheriff's Office
Gadsden County Sheriff's Office
Gilchrist County Sheriff's Office
Glades County Sheriff's Office
Gulf County Sheriff's Office
Hamilton County Sheriff's Office
Hardee County Sheriff's Office
Hendry County Sheriff's Office
Hernando County Sheriff's Office
Highlands County Sheriff's Office
Hillsborough County Sheriff's Office
Holmes County Sheriff's Office
Indian River County Sheriff's Office
Jackson County Sheriff's Office
Jacksonville Sheriff's Office
Jefferson County Sheriff's Office
Lafayette County Sheriff's Office
Lake County Sheriff's Office
Lee County Sheriff's Office

Leon County Sheriff's Office
Levy County Sheriff's Office
Liberty County Sheriff's Office
Madison County Sheriff's Office
Manatee County Sheriff's Office
Marion County Sheriff's Office 
Martin County Sheriff's Office
Miami-Dade Police Department 
Monroe County Sheriff's Office
Nassau County Sheriff's Office
Okaloosa County Sheriff's Office
Okeechobee County Sheriff's Office
Orange County Sheriff's Office
Osceola County Sheriff's Office
Palm Beach County Sheriff's Office
Pasco County Sheriff's Office
Pinellas County Sheriff's Office
Polk County Sheriff's Office
Putnam County Sheriff's Office
Santa Rosa County Sheriff's Office
Sarasota County Sheriff's Office
Seminole County Sheriff's Office
St. Johns County Sheriff's Office
St. Lucie County Sheriff's Office
Sumter County Sheriff's Office
Suwannee County Sheriff's Office
Taylor County Sheriff's Office
Union County Sheriff's Office
Volusia County Public Protection Department
Volusia County Sheriff's Office
Wakulla County Sheriff's Office
Walton County Sheriff's Office
Washington County Sheriff's Office

City Agencies 

Alachua Police Department
Altamonte Springs Police Department
Altha Police Department 
Apalachicola Police Department 
Apopka Police Department 
Arcadia Police Department 
Astatula Police Department 
Atlantic Beach Police Department 
Atlantis Police Department 
Auburndale Police Department 
Aventura Police Department 
Bal Harbour Police Department
Bartow Police Department 
Bay Harbor Islands Police Department 
Belleair Police Department 
Belleview Police Department 
Belle Isle Police Department 
Biscayne Park Police Department
Blountstown Police Department 
Boca Raton Police Department 
Bonifay Police Department 
Bowling Green Police Department 
Boynton Beach Police Department
Bradenton Beach Police Department 
Bradenton Police Department 
Bunnell Police Department 
Cape Coral Police Department 
Carabelle Police Department 
Casselberry Police Department 
Cedar Key Police Department
Chattahoochee Police Department 
Chiefland Police Department 
Chipley Police Department 
Clearwater Police Department 
Clermont Police Department 
Clewiston Police Department 
Cocoa Beach Police Department 
Cocoa Police Department 
Coconut Creek Police Department 
Coral Gables Police Department 
Coral Springs Police Department 
Cottondale Police Department
Crestview Police Department 
Cross City Police Department 
Dade City Police Department 
Davenport Police Department 
Davie Police Department 
Daytona Beach Police Department 
Daytona Beach Shores Department of Public Safety 
DeFuniak Springs Police Department
DeLand Police Department 
Delray Beach Police Department 
Doral Police Department 
Dunnellon Police Department 
Eatonville Police Department 
Edgewater Police Department
Edgewood Police Department 
El Portal Police Department 
Eustis Police Department 
Fellsmere Police Department 
Fernandina Beach Police Department 
Flagler Beach Police Department 
Florida City Police Department 
Fort Lauderdale Police Department  
Fort Myers Police Department  
Fort Pierce Police Department  
Fort Walton Beach Police Department  
Fruitland Park Police Department  
Gainesville Police Department  
Golden Beach Police Department  
Graceville Police Department  
Green Cove Springs Police Department  
Gretna Police Department  
Groveland Police Department  
Gulf Breeze Police Department  
Gulf Stream Police Department  
Gulfport Police Department  
Haines City Police Department  
Hallandale Beach Police Department  
Havana Police Department  
Hialeah Police Department
Hialeah Gardens Police Department  
High Springs Police Department  
Highland Beach Police Department  
Hillsboro Beach Police Department  
Holly Hill Police Department  
Hollywood Police Department  
Holmes Beach Police Department  
Homestead Police Department  
Howey-In-The-Hills Police Department  
Indialantic Police Department 
Indian Creek Village Public Safety Department  
Indian Harbour Beach Police Department  
Indian River Shores Police Department  
Indian Shores Police Department  
Interlachen Police Department  
Jacksonville Beach Police Department  
Jasper Police Department 
Juno Beach Police Department  
Jupiter Inlet Colony Police Department  
Jupiter Island Public Safety Department  
Jupiter Police Department  
Kenneth City Police Department  
Key Biscayne Police Department  
Key Colony Beach Police Department  
Key West Police Department  
Kissimmee Police Department  
Lady Lake Police Department  
Lake Alfred Police Department  
Lake City Police Department  
Lake Clarke Shores Police Department  
Lake Hamilton Police Department  
Lake Mary Police Department  
Lake Placid Police Department  
Lake Wales Police Department  
Lakeland Police Department  
Lantana Police Department  
Largo Police Department  
Lauderhill Police Department  
Lawtey Police Department  
Leesburg Police Department
Lighthouse Point Police Department  

Live Oak Police Department  
Longboat Key Police Department  
Longwood Police Department  
Lynn Haven Police Department  
Madison Police Department  
Maitland Police Department  
Manalapan Police Department  
Marco Island Police Department
Margate Police Department 
Marianna Police Department 
Mascotte Police Department 
Medley Police Department 
Melbourne Beach Police Department 
Melbourne Police Department
Miami Beach Police Department 
Miami Gardens Police Department
Miami Police Department 
Miami Shores Police Department 
Miami Springs Police Department
Midway Police Department 
Milton Police Department 
Miramar Police Department 
Monticello Police Department 
Mount Dora Police Department 
Naples Police Department  
Neptune Beach Police Department 
New Port Richey Police Department 
New Smyrna Beach Police Department 
Niceville Police Department 
North Bay Village Police Department 
North Miami Beach Police Department
North Miami Police Department  
North Palm Beach Police Department  
North Port Police Department  
Oakland Police Department  
Ocala Police Department  
Ocean Ridge Police Department  
Ocoee Police Department  
Okeechobee Police Department  
Opa Locka Police Department  
Orange City Police Department  
Orange Park Police Department  
Orlando Police Department  
Ormond Beach Police Department  
Oviedo Police Department 
Palatka Police Department  
Palm Bay Police Department
Palm Beach Gardens Police Department 
Palm Beach Police Department 
Palm Springs Police Department 
Palmetto Police Department 
Panama City Police Department 
Panama City Beach Police Department 
Parker Police Department 
Pembroke Pines Police Department 
Pensacola Police Department 
Perry Police Department 
Pinecrest Police Department
Pinellas Park Police Department 
Plantation Police Department 
Plant City Police Department 
Ponce Inlet Police Department 
Port Orange Police Department 
Port Richey Police Department 
Port St. Joe Police Department 
Port St. Lucie Police Department 
Punta Gorda Police Department 
Quincy Police Department
Riviera Beach Police Department 
Rockledge Police Department 
Sanford Police Department 
Sanibel Police Department 
Sarasota Police Department 
Satellite Beach Police Department
Sea Ranch Lakes Police Department
Sebastian Police Department 
Sebring Police Department 
Sewalls Point Police Department
Shalimar Police Department 
Sneads Police Department 
South Daytona Police Department 
South Miami Police Department 
Springfield Police Department 
St. Augustine Beach Police Department 
St. Augustine Police Department 
St. Cloud Police Department 
St. Petersburg Police Department  
Starke Police Department 
Stuart Police Department 
Sunny Isles Beach Police Department 
Sunrise Police Department 
Surfside Police Department 
Sweetwater Police Department 
Tallahassee Police Department 
Tampa Police Department 
Tarpon Springs Police Department 
Tavares Police Department 
Temple Terrace Police Department 
Tequesta Police Department 
Titusville Police Department 
Treasure Island Police Department 
Trenton Department of Public Safety 
Umatilla Police Department 
Valparaiso Police Department 
Venice Police Department 
 Vero Beach Police Department 
Virginia Gardens Police Department 
Wauchula Police Department 
Welaka Police Department 
West Melbourne Police Department 
West Miami Police Department 
West Palm Beach Police Department 
Wildwood Police Department 
Williston Police Department 
Wilton Manors Police Department 
Windermere Police Department 
Winter Garden Police Department 
Winter Haven Police Department
Winter Park Police Department 
Winter Springs Police Department
Zephyrhills Police Department

University & College Agencies
Florida Agricultural and Mechanical University Department of Campus Safety and Security
Florida Atlantic University Police Department
Florida Gulf Coast University Police Department
Florida International University Police Department
Florida Polytechnic University Police Department
Florida Southwestern State College Department of Public Safety
Florida State University Police Department
New College of Florida/University of South Florida Sarasota-Manatee Campus Police Department
Northwest Florida State College Police Department
Pensacola State College Department of Public Safety
Santa Fe College Police Department
Tallahassee Community College Police Department
University of Florida Police Department
University of Central Florida Police Department
University of Miami Police Department
University of North Florida Police Department
University of South Florida Police Department
University of South Florida St. Petersburg Police Department
University of West Florida Police Department

School District Agencies
Alachua County Public Schools’ Office of Safety and Security
Bay District Schools Department of Safety & Security
Broward County Public Schools Special Investigative Unit
Citrus County School Board Police Department
Clay County District Schools Police Department
Duval County School Police Department
Florida School for the Deaf and Blind Police Department
Jackson District School Board Police Department
Leon County Schools Department of Safety and Security
Marion County School Board Police Department
Miami-Dade Schools Police Department
Nassau County Schools Department of Student Safety
Orange County Public Schools District Police Department
Palm Beach County School District Police Department
Pinellas County Schools Police Department
Putnam County School District Police Department
Sarasota County Schools Police Department
Washington County Schools/Florida Panhandle Technical College Department of Public Safety

Airport Agencies
Jacksonville Aviation Authority Police Department
Lee County Port Authority Police Department
Melbourne Airport Police Department
Northwest Florida Beaches International Airport Police Department
Sanford Airport Police Department
Sarasota-Manatee Airport Authority Police Department
Tampa International Airport Police Department

Native American Tribe Agencies
Miccosukee Police Department
Seminole Police Department

Railroad Police
CSX Police Department
Norfolk Southern Railroad Police Department
Florida East Coast Railway Police Department
Seminole Gulf Railway Police Department

Private Corrections 
Bridges International
The Bradenton Bridge Community Release Center
The Cocoa Bridge Community Release Center
The Jacksonville Bridge Community Release Center
The Lake City Bridge Community Release Center
The Orlando Bridge Community Release Center
The Santa Fe Bridge Community Release Center
CoreCivic
Citrus County Detention Center
Lake City Youthful Offender Facility
Correct Care Solutions
Florida Civil Commitment Center
South Florida Evaluation and Treatment Center
South Florida State Hospital
Goodwill Industries-Suncoast, Inc.
Hillsborough County Residential Re-entry Center
St. Petersburg Suncoast Work-Release Center
Management and Training Corporation
Gadsden Correctional Facility
The GEO Group, Inc.
Bay Correctional Facility
Blackwater River Correctional Facility
Graceville Correctional Facility
Moore Haven Correctional Facility
South Bay Correctional Facility
The Transition House, Inc.
The Transition House Bartow Work Release Center
The Transition House Dinsmore Work Release Center
The Transition House Kissimmee Work Release Center
The Transition House Tarpon Springs Work Release Center

Disbanded Agencies 
Anna Maria Police Department
Avon Park Police Department - Disbanded on October 1, 2012
 Baldwin Police Department - Disbanded on March 13, 2006
 Belle Glade Police Department
 Brooksville Police Department 
 Bushnell Police Department - Disbanded on September 30, 2012
 Callahan Police Department - Disbanded on January 21, 1981
Callaway Police Department - Disbanded on July 10, 1992
 Cape Canaveral Police Department - Disbanded on November 1, 1977
Cedar Grove Police Department - Disbanded on October 22, 2008
Center Hill Police Department - Disbanded in 2021.
Century Police Department
 Cooper City Police Department - Disbanded on January 13, 2004
Crescent City Police Department - Disbanded February of 2021.
 Crystal River Police Department - Disbanded on January 23, 2008
 Dade County Sheriff's Office
 Dundee Police Department - Disbanded on October 1, 2008
 Dunedin Police Department - Disbanded on October 1, 1995
 Duval County Sheriff's Office - Consolidated into the Jacksonville Sheriff's Office on October 1, 1968
 Eagle Lake Police Department - Disbanded on August 1, 2007
 Florida Department of Environmental Protection Division of Law Enforcement Bureau of Park Patrol - Merged with the Florida Fish and Wildlife Conservation Commission on July 1, 2012.
Florida Department of Transportation Office of Motor Carrier Compliance - Merged with the Florida Highway Patrol on July 1, 2011.
Florida Game and Freshwater Commission - Merged with Florida Fish and Wildlife Conservation Commission on July 1, 1999.
Florida Marine Patrol - Merged with the Florida Fish and Wildlife Conservation Commission on July 1, 1999.
 Florida State Beverage Department
 Frostproof Police Department - Disbanded on November 1, 2006
 Greenacres Police Department
Greensboro Police Department
 Hampton Police Department - Disbanded on February 27, 2014
Hawthorne Police Department - Disbanded on January 1, 2009
 Horseshoe Beach Police Department - Disbanded on March 13, 1993
 Inverness Police Department - Disbanded on March 31, 2004
Inglis Police Department - Disbanded on September 30, 2013
 Jacksonville Police Department - Consolidated into the Jacksonville Sheriff's Office on October 1, 1968
 Lake Worth Police Department - Disbanded on September 30, 2008
Lauderdale-By-The-Sea Police Department
 Macclenny Police Department - Disbanded on October 1, 1980
 Madeira Beach Police Department - Disbanded on September 16, 1995
Mangonia Police Department
 Melbourne Village Police Department - Disbanded on August 18, 2022 
Mexico Beach Police Department - Disbanded on November 1, 2019
 Mulberry Police Department - Disbanded on June 1, 2009
 Oak Hill Police Department - Disbanded on August 1, 2011
Okaloosa County Airports Police Department
Panama City-Bay County International Airport Police Department - Disbanded on October 1, 2010
Palm Beach Shores Police Department - Disbanded on October 31, 2019
Pensacola Airport Police Department
Pompano Beach Police Department
Port Canaveral Police Department - Disbanded on September 30, 2014
Polk City Police Department
Orchid Police Department
 Royal Palm Beach Police Department - Disbanded on September 1, 2006
 South Bay Police Department
South Palm Beach Police Department - Disbanded on October 1, 2019
 St. Pete Beach Police Department - Disbanded on January 1, 2013
 Waldo Police Department - Disbanded on October 1, 2014
 Webster Police Department - Disbanded on September 30, 2016
White Springs Police Department - Disbanded 2021.
 West Tampa Police Department - Merged with Tampa Police Department in 1925
Zolfo Springs Police Department - Disbanded on August 1, 2010

References

Florida
Law enforcement agencies of Florida
Law enforcement agencies